Jay Benedict (April 11, 1951 – April 4, 2020) was an American actor who spent most of his life and career in the United Kingdom. He was frequently cast as American characters in British films and television programmes. He was best known for his television roles as Doug Hamilton in the soap opera Emmerdale, and as Captain/Major John Kieffer in the detective drama Foyle's War, in the episodes "Invasion" and "All Clear". He also played Russ Jorden, Newt's father, in the special "Extended Edition" of the film Aliens.

Life and career
Benedict was born in Burbank, California. He moved to Europe with his family in the 1960s, and spent most of his working life in England. He was of half German descent. His theatrical credits include The Rocky Horror Show in the Kings Road in the early 1970s, Harold Pinter's production of Sweet Bird of Youth, The Reverend Lee in The Foreigner and Riccardo in Franco Zeffirelli's production of Filumena in which he played opposite Pierce Brosnan in the latter's first stage role, and Bill Wilson, co-founder of Alcoholics Anonymous, in a touring production of "One Day at a Time". In 2013, he appeared opposite  Steven Berkoff and Andree Bernard in the world premiere of the former's one act play An Actor's Lament at The Berkoff Performing Arts Centre at Alton College, followed by a second performance at The Sinden Theatre, Homewood School, Tenterden in Kent, two nights at The Maltings Theatre & Cinema in Berwick-upon-Tweed and then a three-week run at the Assembly Hall in Edinburgh as part of the Edinburgh Festival Fringe. In May 2014, it was revived with a short run at the Theatre Royal, Margate with a further one-week run scheduled at The Gaiety Theatre, Dublin, in September 2014.

In August 2014, he returned to the Edinburgh Festival Fringe in the world premiere of Terry Jastrow's The Trial of Jane Fonda, playing World War II veteran Archie Bellows.

He also appeared widely on television, most notably as Frank Crowe in an episode of the BBC's award-winning 2003 television miniseries Seven Wonders of the Industrial World, John E. Jones III in Nova's Judgment Day: Intelligent Design on Trial, Alan Kalanak in the 2001 Christmas Special edition of Jonathan Creek and Yves Houdet in Thames Television's mini-series of Angus Wilson's Anglo-Saxon Attitudes. Other television appearances include  Lilyhammer as Agent Becker, Queen Victoria's Men (Lord Melbourne), Sharpe's Honour (General Verigny), Bergerac (Martin Colley), Death Train (Halloran), Harnessing Peacocks (Eli Drew) and Only Love (Roger).  He provided the voice for Shiro Hagen in Star Fleet, the English adaptation of the Japanese X-Bomber.

His first film role, at the age of 11, was in the 1963 Tony Saytor film La Bande à Bobo. In 1977, he played Deak in the Tosche Station scenes in Star Wars, which were deleted from the film before release. Subsequent film appearances include The Dirty Dozen: Next Mission (Didier le Clair), Icon (Carey Jordan), The White Knight (Turkish Ambassador), The Russia House (Spikey), Saving Grace (the MC), Rewind and The Dark Knight Rises (Rich Twit).  In 2003 he was third lead in Vicente Aranda's  version of Carmen, playing Don Prospero.

In addition to English, he also spoke fluent French and Spanish, having spent parts of his childhood in both countries, and performed widely on the continent. He appeared as Paul Matthiews in the French day-time soap opera Cap des Pins and William Wilbur  in Le Grand Charles (a French mini series on Charles De Gaulle), among many other roles.

He was married to actress Phoebe Scholfield and together they ran Sync or Swim, an ADR/Loop group. They also translated and wrote  movies together, such as The Card Player (Il Cartaio), which they translated into English. They had two sons: Leopold Benedict (Before the Rains, Azur & Asmar: The Princes' Quest) and Freddie Benedict (Planet 51, Azur & Asmar: The Princes' Quest). He also had a daughter from his previous marriage to casting director Vanessa Pereira.

Death
Benedict died at Croydon University Hospital on April 4, 2020, a week before his 69th birthday, due to complications arising from a COVID-19 infection during the pandemic in London. He is survived by his mother Renata (b. 1926), his wife Phoebe (b. 1958) and his children Alexis (b. 1984), Frederick (b. 1996) and Leopold (b. 1997).

Filmography

References

External links

Jay Benedict on Foyleswar.com

1951 births
2020 deaths
20th-century American male actors
20th-century American translators
21st-century American male actors
21st-century American translators
American emigrants to England
American expatriate male actors in the United Kingdom
American male film actors
American male stage actors
American male television actors
American people of French descent
Male actors from Burbank, California
Deaths from the COVID-19 pandemic in England